Playboy Shootout was an adult reality competition airing on Playboy TV produced by America's Next Top Model director Claudia Frank. Hosted by Brande Roderick, it pits 10 professional photographers and 10 models in a series of photo shoot elimination rounds. The final 2 contestants get the opportunity to be published in Playboy Magazine.

History
Beginning in November 2009, PlayboyTV.com announced that it was searching for professional photographers and fashion models to compete on the Playboy Shootout reality series. Submissions were accepted via the online site and ultimately the applicants were whittled down into groups of 10 for each category, hand-picked by Hugh Hefner himself.

In early 2010, the final contestants were assembled and brought to a private Malibu mansion where they were broken into groups of 2 and instructed to endure a series of challenges. Similar to the format of Project Runway, each team of 1 photographer and 1 model was required to face a panel of 3 judges after shooting a series of pictorials utilizing specific elements dictated by host Brande Roderick (fire, water, motorcycles, etc.). The 2 mainstay judges were Playboy photographer Stephen Wayda and former Playmate, Cara Zavaleta. A third judge seat was filled by a revolving slot of Playboy-related celebrity guests, including Adrianne Curry, Sara Jean Underwood, Andrea Lowell, Tiffany Fallon, Traci Bingham, Ida Ljungqvist, Carmella DeCesare, and The Girls Next Door.

One by one, each team was eliminated, with ultimately 1 photographer and 1 model getting the chance to be featured in Playboy magazine.

Playboy Shootout premiered on April 3, 2010 at 10:00pm EST, as part of Playboy TV's new Saturday block of Date Night couples-friendly programming with a new episode appearing every Saturday until the finale on June 5, 2010.

Contestants

References

External links
Playboy Shootout Official Site

Playboy Shootout on Facebook
PlayboyTV on Twitter

2010s American reality television series
2010 American television series debuts
2010 American television series endings
Television series by Playboy Enterprises
Playboy TV original programming